Acta Theologica is a peer-reviewed open access academic journal published by the University of the Free State. It covers all aspects of Christian theology.

Acta Theologica was established in 1980 and is published twice a year. The editor-in-chief is Martin Laubscher.

Acta Theologica is abstracted and indexed in the ATLA Religion Database and Scopus. It is hosted by African Journals OnLine.

References

University of the Free State
Christianity studies journals
Biannual journals
Publications established in 1980
Academic journals published by universities and colleges
Academic journals published in South Africa